The 1998–99 British National League season was the third season of the British National League, the second level of ice hockey in Great Britain. Nine teams participated in the league, and the Fife Flyers won the championship.

First round

Playoffs

Group A

Group B

Semifinals 
 Slough Jets - Basingstoke Bison 3:1
 Guildford Flames - Fife Flyers 3:4

Final 
 Slough Jets - Fife Flyers 5:6 SO

External links 
 Season on hockeyarchives.info

British National League (1996–2005) seasons
United
2